Joseph James DeAngelo Jr. (born November 8, 1945) is an American serial killer, sex offender, burglar, and former police officer who committed at least 13 murders, 51 rapes, and 120 burglaries across California between 1974 and 1986. He is responsible for at least three separate crime sprees throughout the state, each of which spawned a different nickname in the press, before it became evident that they were committed by the same person. 

In the San Joaquin Valley, DeAngelo was known as the Visalia Ransacker before moving to the Sacramento area, where he became known as the East Area Rapist and was linked by modus operandi to additional attacks in Stockton, Modesto and Contra Costa County. DeAngelo committed serial murders in Santa Barbara, Ventura, and Orange counties, where he was known as the Night Stalker and later the Original Night Stalker (owing to serial killer Richard Ramirez also being called the "Night Stalker"). He is believed to have taunted and threatened both victims and police in obscene phone calls and possibly written communications.

During the decades-long investigation, several suspects were cleared through DNA evidence, alibis, or other investigative methods. In 2001, after DNA testing indicated that the East Area Rapist and the Original Night Stalker were the same person, the combined acronym EARONS came into use. The case was a factor in the establishment of California's DNA database, which collects DNA from all accused and convicted felons in California and has been called second only to Virginia's in effectiveness in solving cold cases. To heighten awareness of the case, crime writer Michelle McNamara coined the name Golden State Killer in early 2013.

On June 15, 2016, the Federal Bureau of Investigation (FBI) and local law enforcement agencies held a news conference to announce a renewed nationwide effort, offering a $50,000 reward for the Golden State Killer's capture. On April 24, 2018, the State of California charged 72-year-old DeAngelo with eight counts of first-degree murder, based upon DNA evidence; investigators had identified members of DeAngelo's family through forensic genetic genealogy. This was also the first announcement connecting the Visalia Ransacker crimes to DeAngelo. Owing to California's statute of limitations on pre-2017 rape cases, DeAngelo could not be charged with 1970s rapes; but he was charged in August 2018 with thirteen related kidnapping and abduction attempts. 

On June 29, 2020, DeAngelo pled guilty to multiple counts of murder and kidnapping. As part of a plea bargain that spared him the death penalty, DeAngelo also admitted to numerous crimes with which he had not been formally charged, including rapes. On August 21, 2020, DeAngelo was sentenced to life imprisonment without the possibility of parole.

Early life and career 

Joseph James DeAngelo Jr. was born on November 8, 1945, in Bath, New York, to Kathleen Louise DeGroat and Joseph James DeAngelo Sr., a sergeant in the United States Army. He has two sisters and a younger brother. A relative reported that when DeAngelo was a young child, he witnessed the rape of his seven-year-old sister by two airmen in a warehouse in West Germany, where the family was stationed at the time. Following DeAngelo's conviction, one of his sisters claimed that he was abused by their father while he was growing up.

Between 1959 and 1960, DeAngelo attended Mills Junior High School in Rancho Cordova, California. Beginning in 1961, he attended Folsom High School, from which he received a GED certificate in 1964. He played on the school's junior varsity baseball team. Prosecutors reported that DeAngelo committed burglaries and tortured and killed animals during his teenage years.

DeAngelo joined the United States Navy in September 1964 and served for 22 months during the Vietnam War as a damage controlman on the cruiser  and the destroyer tender . Beginning in August 1968, DeAngelo attended Sierra College in Rocklin, California; he graduated with an associate degree in police science, with honors. He attended Sacramento State University in 1971, where he earned a bachelor's degree in criminal justice. DeAngelo later took post-graduate courses and further police training at the College of the Sequoias in Visalia, then completed a 32-week police internship at the police department in Roseville.

Police officer
From May 1973 to August 1976, DeAngelo was a burglary unit police officer in Exeter, having relocated from Citrus Heights. He then served in Auburn from August 1976 to July 1979, when he was arrested for shoplifting a hammer and dog repellent; he was sentenced to six months of probation and fired that October.

During the process of being fired, DeAngelo threatened to kill the chief of police and allegedly stalked the chief's house.

Marriage and relationships 
In May 1970, DeAngelo became engaged to nursing student Bonnie Jean Colwell, a classmate at Sierra College, but she broke it off in 1971 after DeAngelo became manipulative and abusive, culminating in his demand that she help him cheat on an abnormal psychology test. After the break up he attempted to force her to marry him by threatening her with a gun.

In November 1973, he married Sharon Marie Huddle of Citrus Heights. The wedding was held at Auburn First Congregational Church. In 1980, they purchased a house in Citrus Heights, where he was eventually arrested decades later. Huddle became a divorce attorney in 1982, and they had three daughters: two were born in Sacramento and one was born in Los Angeles.

The couple separated in 1991. In July 2018, several months after DeAngelo's arrest, Huddle filed for a divorce, which was finalized the following year.

Other employment
DeAngelo's employment history during the 1980s is unknown. From 1990 until his retirement in 2017, he worked as a truck mechanic at a Save Mart Supermarkets distribution center in Roseville. He was arrested in 1996 for failing to pay for gas, but the charge was dismissed.

Loud outbursts
DeAngelo's brother-in-law claimed that DeAngelo would casually bring up the East Area Rapist in conversation around the time of the original crimes. Neighbors reported that he frequently engaged in loud, profane outbursts. One neighbor reported that his family received a phone message from DeAngelo threatening to "deliver a load of death" because of their barking dog. He was living with a daughter and granddaughter at the time of his arrest.

Crimes 

DNA evidence linked DeAngelo to eight murders in Goleta, Ventura, Dana Point, and Irvine; two other murders in Goleta, lacking DNA evidence, were linked by modus operandi. DeAngelo pleaded guilty to three other murders: two in Rancho Cordova and one in Visalia. He also committed more than 50 known rapes in the California counties of Sacramento, Contra Costa, Stanislaus, San Joaquin, Alameda, Santa Clara, and Yolo; and he was linked to hundreds of incidents of thefts, burglaries, vandalism, peeping, stalking, and prowling.

Visalia Ransacker (1974–1976) 
It was long suspected that the training ground of the criminal who became the East Area Rapist was Visalia, (although earlier Visalia crimes dating back as early as May 1973 and other sprees like that of the "Cordova Cat Burglar" and the "Exeter Ransacker" as well as Visalia burglaries that took place after the McGowen shooting, are now suspected to be linked as well). Over a period of 20 months, DeAngelo is believed to have been responsible for one murder and around 120 burglaries.

In late April 2018, the Visalia chief of police stated that while there was no DNA linking DeAngelo to the Central Valley cases, his department had other evidence that played a role in the investigation; and he was "confident that the Visalia Ransacker has been captured". Though the statutes of limitations for the burglaries have each expired, DeAngelo was formally charged on August 13, 2018, with the first degree murder of Claude Snelling in 1975. In 2020, DeAngelo pleaded guilty to the Snelling murder.

Burglaries

The first recorded ransacking occurred on March 19, 1974, when a sum of $50 in coins was stolen from a piggy bank. Most of the Ransacker's activities involved breaking into houses, rifling through or vandalizing the owner's possessions, scattering women's underclothes, and stealing a range of low-value items while often ignoring banknotes and higher-valued items in plain sight. The Ransacker would also often arrange or display items in the house. Items emptied included piggy banks and coin jars; and stolen items often included Blue Chip Stamps, foreign or historic coins, and personal items (such as single earrings, cuff-links, rings, or medallions) but also included six weapons and various types of ammunition. Multiple same-day ransackings were common as well, including 12 separate incidents on November 30, 1974.

Common MOs of the burglaries included:

 climbing fences and moving through established routes such as parks, walkways, ditches, and trails
 attempting to pry open multiple points of entry, particularly windows
 leaving multiple points of escape open, especially windows, as well as the house, garage, and garden doors
 moving removed window screens onto beds or into bedrooms
 placing "warning items" such as dishes or bottles against doors and on door handles
 wearing gloves (given the absence of fingerprint evidence)

Shootings
On September 11, 1975, DeAngelo broke into the home of Claude Snelling, 45, at 532 Whitney Lane (now South Whitney Street). Snelling, a journalism professor at the College of the Sequoias, had previously chased a prowler discovered under his daughter's window around 10:00  on February 5, 1975. On September 11, he was awakened around 2:00  by strange noises. Upon leaving his bedroom, Snelling ran through the open back door and confronted a ski-masked intruder in his carport attempting to kidnap his daughter, who had been subdued with threats of being stabbed or shot. Snelling was then shot twice, staggered back into the house to his wife, and later died. After the shooting, the assailant fled the scene, leaving behind a stolen bicycle at 615 Redwood Street. After the murder, Beth Snelling, 16, underwent hypnosis in order to gather further details. The Visalia police also committed more resources to apprehending the Ransacker, and a $4,000 reward (equivalent to $19,366 in 2021) was posted. Nighttime stakeouts were set up near houses that he had previously prowled, but the ransackings continued.

Around 8:30  on December 12, 1975, a masked man entered the back yard of a house at 1505 W. Kaweah Avenue, near where the Ransacker had been reported to frequent. When Detective William McGowen (on stakeout inside the garage) attempted to detain the man, the suspect shrieked, removed his mask, and feigned surrender after McGowen fired a warning shot. However, after jumping the fence to the house at 1501, he also pulled out a revolver with his left hand and fired once near McGowen's face, shattering his flashlight. Nearby officers rushed to aid McGowen, and the shooter was able to escape. Items collected as evidence included the flashlight, tennis shoe tracks, and dropped loot, namely Blue Chip Stamps and a sock full of coins.

East Area Rapist (1976–1979) 

DeAngelo moved to the Sacramento area in 1976, where his crimes escalated from burglary to rape. The crimes initially centered on the then-unincorporated areas of Carmichael, Citrus Heights, and Rancho Cordova, east of Sacramento. His initial modus operandi was to stalk middle-class neighborhoods at night in search of women who were alone in one-story homes, usually near a school, creek, trail, or other open space that would provide a quick escape. He was seen a number of times but always successfully fled; on one occasion, he shot and seriously wounded a young pursuer.

Most victims had seen (or heard) a prowler on their property before the attacks, and many had experienced break-ins. Police believed that the offender would conduct extensive reconnaissance in a targeted neighborhood—looking into windows and prowling in yards—before selecting a home to attack. It was believed that he sometimes entered the homes of future victims to unlock windows, unload guns, and plant ligatures for later use. He frequently telephoned future victims, sometimes for months in advance, to learn their daily routines.

Although DeAngelo originally targeted women alone in their homes or with children, he eventually preferred attacking couples. This change in modus operandi is believed to be a direct result of media reports claiming he only attacked women alone in the home. His usual method was to break in through a window or sliding glass door and awaken the sleeping occupants with a flashlight, threatening them with a handgun. Victims were subsequently bound with ligatures (often shoelaces) that he found or brought with him, then blindfolded and gagged with towels that he had ripped into strips. The female victim was usually forced to tie up her male companion before she was bound. The bindings were often so tight that the victims' hands were numb for hours after being untied. He then separated the couple, often stacking dishes on the male's back and threatening to kill everyone in the house if he heard them rattle. He would move the woman to the living room and rape her, often repeatedly. A decade later, police reported that DeAngelo repeatedly said, “I hate you, Bonnie,” during a 1978 rape, the 37th attack.

DeAngelo sometimes spent hours in the home ransacking closets and drawers, eating food in the kitchen, drinking beer, raping the woman again, or making additional threats. Victims sometimes thought he had left the house before he "jump[ed] from the darkness". He typically stole items—often personal objects and items of little value, but occasionally cash and firearms. He then crept away, leaving victims uncertain if he had left. He was believed to escape on foot through a series of yards and then use a bicycle to go home or to a car, making extensive use of parks, schoolyards, creek beds, and other open spaces that kept him off the street.

The East Area Rapist operated in Sacramento County from the first attacks in June 1976 until May 1977. After a three-month gap, he struck in nearby San Joaquin County in September before returning to Sacramento for all but one of the next ten attacks. The rapist attacked five times during the summer of 1978 in Stanislaus and Yolo counties before disappearing again for three months. Attacks then moved primarily to Contra Costa County in October and lasted until July 1979.

Rapes

Murders 

A young Sacramento couple—Brian Maggiore, a military policeman at Mather Air Force Base, and his wife Katie Maggiore—were walking their dog in the Rancho Cordova area on the night of February 2, 1978, near where five East Area Rapist attacks had occurred. The Maggiores fled after a confrontation in the street but were chased down and shot to death. Some investigators suspected that they had been murdered by the East Area Rapist because of their proximity to the other attacks' locations, and a shoelace was found nearby. The FBI announced on June 15, 2016, that it was confident that the East Area Rapist had murdered the Maggiores. On June 29, 2020, DeAngelo entered a plea of guilty to these murders.

Original Night Stalker (1979–1986) 
Shortly after the rape committed on July 5, 1979, DeAngelo moved to Southern California and began killing his victims, first striking in Santa Barbara County in October. The attacks lasted until 1981 (with a lone 1986 attack). Only the couple in the first attack survived, alerting neighbors and forcing the intruder to flee; the other victims were murdered by gunshot or bludgeoning. Since DeAngelo was not linked to these crimes for decades, he was known as the Night Stalker in the area, before being renamed the Original Night Stalker after serial killer Richard Ramirez received the former nickname.

1979 
On October 1, an intruder broke in and tied up a Goleta couple. Alarmed at hearing him say, "I'll kill 'em" to himself,  the man and woman tried to escape when he left the room, and the woman screamed. Realizing that the alarm had been raised, the intruder fled on a bicycle. A neighbor (an FBI agent) responded to the noise and pursued the perpetrator, who abandoned the bicycle and a knife and fled on foot through local backyards. The attack was later linked to the Offerman–Manning murders by shoe prints and twine used to bind the victims.

On December 30, 44 year-old Robert Offerman and 35 year-old Debra Alexandra Manning were found shot to death at Offerman's condominium on Avenida Pequena in Goleta. Offerman's bindings were untied, indicating that he had lunged at the attacker. Neighbors had heard gunshots. Paw prints of a large dog were found at the scene, leading to speculation that the killer may have brought one with him. The killer had also broken into the vacant adjoining residence and stole a bicycle, later found abandoned on a street north of the scene, from a third residence in the complex.

1980 
On March 13, 33 year-old Charlene Smith and 43 year-old Lyman Smith were found murdered in their Ventura home; Charlene Smith had been raped. A log from a woodpile on the side of the house was used to bludgeon the victims to death. Their wrists and ankles had been bound with drapery cord. An unusual Chinese knot, a diamond knot, was used on Charlene's wrists; the same knot was noted in the East Area Rapist attacks, at least one confirmed case of which was publicly known. The murderer was, therefore, briefly given the name Diamond Knot Killer.

On August 19, 24 year-old Keith Eli Harrington and 27 year-old Patrice Briscoe Harrington were found bludgeoned to death in their home on Cockleshell Drive in Dana Point's Niguel Shores gated community. Patrice Harrington had also been raped. Although there was evidence that the Harringtons' wrists and ankles were bound, no murder weapon or ligatures were found at the scene. The Harringtons had been married for three months at the time of their deaths. Patrice was a nurse in Irvine, and Keith was a medical student at UC Irvine. Keith's brother Bruce later spent nearly $2 million supporting California Proposition 69, authorizing DNA collection from all California felons and certain other criminals.

1981 
On February 6, 28 year-old Manuela Witthuhn was raped and murdered in her Irvine home. Although Witthuhn's body had signs of being tied before she was bludgeoned, no murder weapon or ligatures were found. Though the victim was married, her husband was away, hospitalized; and she was alone at the time of the attack. Witthuhn's television was found in the backyard, possibly the killer's attempt to make the crime appear to be a botched robbery.

On July 27, 35 year-old Cheri Domingo and 27 year-old Gregory Sanchez became the Original Night Stalker's tenth and eleventh murder victims. Both were attacked in Domingo's residence on Toltec Way in Goleta (several blocks south of Robert Offerman's condominium), where she was living temporarily; it was owned by a relative and up for sale. The offender entered the house through a small bathroom window. Sanchez had not been tied and was shot and wounded in the cheek before he was bludgeoned to death with a garden tool.

Some believe that Sanchez may have realized he was dealing with the man responsible for the Offerman–Manning murders and tried to tackle the killer rather than be tied up. Again, no neighbors responded to the gunshot. Sanchez's head was covered with clothes pulled from the closet. Domingo was raped and bludgeoned; bruises on her wrists and ankles indicated that she had been tied, although the restraints were missing. A piece of shipping twine was found near the bed, and fibers from an unknown source were scattered over her body. Authorities believed that the attacker may have worked as a painter or in a similar job at the Calle Real Shopping Centre.

1986 
On May 4, 18 year-old Janelle Lisa Cruz was found dead after she was raped and bludgeoned to death in her Irvine home. Her family was on vacation in Mexico at the time of the attack. A pipe wrench, reported missing by Cruz's stepfather, was thought to be the murder weapon.

Initially, investigators in respective jurisdictions did not think the southern California murders were connected. A Sacramento detective strongly believed that the East Area Rapist was responsible for the Goleta attacks, but the Santa Barbara County Sheriff's Office attributed them to a local career criminal who was later murdered. Unaware of the Goleta murders, local police in surrounding jurisdictions followed false leads related to men who were close to the female victims. One person, later cleared, was charged with two of the murders. Many years later, the cases were linked almost entirely by DNA testing.

Communications

Written

"Excitement's Crave" poem 
In December 1977, someone claiming to be the East Area Rapist sent a poem, "Excitement's Crave", to The Sacramento Bee, the Sacramento mayor's office, and television station KVIE. On December 11, a masked man eluded pursuit by law-enforcement personnel after alerting authorities by telephone that he would strike on Watt Avenue that night.

Homework pages and punishment map (December 9, 1978)

During the investigation in Danville of the 42nd attack, investigators discovered three sheets of notebook paper near where a suspicious vehicle had reportedly been parked. They believe the pages were dropped accidentally, perhaps by falling out of a bag. The first sheet appears to be a homework essay on General George Armstrong Custer.

The second sheet contains a journal-style entry describing a teacher who made students write lines, which the author found humiliating:

On the last sheet was a hand-drawn map of what appears to be a suburban neighborhood, with the word "punishment" scrawled across the reverse side. Investigators were unable to identify the area depicted in the map, although the artist clearly had knowledge of architectural layout and landscape design. According to Detective Larry Pool, the map is a fantasy location representing the rapist's desired striking ground.

Phone calls

"I'm the East Side Rapist" (March 18, 1977) 
On March 18, 1977, the Sacramento County Sheriff's Office received three calls from a man claiming to be the East Area Rapist; none were recorded. The first two calls, received at 4:15 and 4:30 , were identical and ended with the caller laughing and hanging up. The final call came in at 5:00 , with the caller saying: "I'm the East Side Rapist and I have my next victim already stalked and you guys can't catch me."

"You're never gonna catch me" (December 2, 1977) 
A man claiming to be the rapist called the Sacramento Police Department, saying: "You're never gonna catch me, East Area Rapist, you dumb fuckers; I'm gonna fuck again tonight. Be careful!" The call was recorded and later released. As with the previous call, the next victim was attacked that night.

"Merry Christmas" (December 9, 1977) 
During the 1977 Christmas season, a previous victim received a phone call that she attributed to her attacker. The caller said, "Merry Christmas, it's me again!"

"Watt Avenue" (December 10, 1977) 
Shortly before 10:00  on December 10, 1977, Sacramento authorities received two identical calls, saying, "I am going to hit tonight. Watt Avenue ." Both were recorded, and the caller was identified as the same person who placed the call on December 2. Law-enforcement patrols were increased that night; and at 2:30 , a masked man eluded officers after being seen bicycling on the Watt Avenue bridge. When spotted again at 4:30 , he discarded the bicycle and fled on foot. The bicycle had been stolen.

"Gonna kill you" (January 2, 1978) 
The first known rape victim received a wrong-number call asking for "Ray" on January 2, 1978. The call was recorded, and police suspect that it may be the same caller who made a threatening call to her later that evening. That call was also recorded and identified by the victim as the voice of her assailant. The caller said, "Gonna kill you ... gonna kill you ... gonna kill you ... bitch ... bitch ... bitch ... bitch ... fuckin' whore."

Counseling service (January 6, 1978) 
A man claiming to be the East Area Rapist called the Contact Counseling Service and said, "I have a problem. I need help because I don't want to do this anymore." After a short conversation, the caller said, "I believe you are tracing this call" and hung up.

Later calls (1982–1991) 
In 1982, a previous victim received a call at her place of work—a Denny's restaurant—during which the rapist threatened to rape her again. According to Contra Costa County investigator Paul Holes, the rapist must have chanced to patronize the restaurant and recognized his victim there.

In 1991, a previous victim received a phone call from the perpetrator and spoke with him for one minute. She could hear a woman and children in the background, leading to speculation that he had a family.

Final call (2001) 
On April 6, 2001, one day after an article in The Sacramento Bee linked the Original Night Stalker and the East Area Rapist, a victim of the rapist received a call from him; he asked, "Remember when we played?"

Investigation 

Before officially connecting the Original Night Stalker to the East Area Rapist in 2001, some law-enforcement officials (particularly from the Sacramento County Sheriff's Department) sought to link the Goleta cases as well. The links were primarily due to similarities in modus operandi. In 2001, several rapes in Contra Costa County believed to have been committed by the East Area Rapist were linked by DNA to the Smith, Harrington, Witthuhn, and Cruz murders. A decade later, DNA evidence indicated that the Domingo–Sanchez murders were also committed by the East Area Rapist (also identified as the Golden State Killer).

On June 15, 2016, the FBI released further information related to the crimes, including new composite sketches and crime details; a $50,000 reward was also announced. The initiative included a national database to support law enforcement's investigating of the crimes and to handle tips and information. Eventually, "through the use of genetic genealogy searching on GEDmatch, investigators identified distant relatives of DeAngelo—including family members directly related to his great-great-great-great grandfather dating back to the 1800s. Based on this information, investigators built about 25 different family trees. The tree that eventually linked to [DeAngelo] alone contained approximately 1,000 people. Over the course of a few months, investigators used other clues like age, sex, and place of residence to rule out suspects populating these trees, eliminating suspects one by one until only DeAngelo remained."

Identification of DeAngelo began in December 2017 when officials, led by detective Paul Holes and FBI lawyer Steve Kramer, uploaded the killer's DNA profile from a Ventura County rape kit to the personal genomics website GEDmatch. The website identified ten to twenty people who had the same great-great-great grandparents as the Golden State Killer; a team of five investigators working with genealogist Barbara Rae-Venter used this list to construct a large family tree. From this tree, they established two suspects; one was ruled out by a relative's DNA test, leaving DeAngelo the main suspect.

On April 18, 2018, a DNA sample was surreptitiously collected from the door handle of DeAngelo's car; another sample was later collected from a tissue found in DeAngelo's curbside garbage can. Both were matched to samples associated with Golden State Killer crimes. Since DeAngelo's arrest, some commentators have raised concerns about the ethics of the secondary use of personally identifiable information.

During the investigation, several people were considered and later eliminated as suspects:
 Brett Glasby, from Goleta, was considered a suspect by Santa Barbara County investigators. He was murdered in Mexico in 1982 before the murder of Janelle Cruz, eliminating him as a suspect.
 Paul "Cornfed" Schneider, a high-ranking member of the Aryan Brotherhood, was living in Orange County when the Harringtons, Manuela Witthuhn, and Janelle Cruz were killed. A DNA test cleared him in the 1990s.
 Joe Alsip, a friend and business partner of the victim Lyman Smith. Alsip's pastor said that Alsip had confessed to him during a family-counseling session. Alsip was arraigned for the Smith murders in 1982, but the charges were later dropped, and his innocence was confirmed by DNA testing in 1997.

Other suspected murders 
After DeAngelo was arrested, he was also suspected of committing the 1974 Visalia rape and murder of Jennifer Armour, the 1975 Exeter rape and murder of Donna Jo Richmond, and a 1978 murder of a woman and her son in Simi Valley, but was cleared as a suspect in all three murders by DNA testing. Victoria Police ruled out a link between DeAngelo, who docked in Australia during his Navy service, and the Melbourne serial child rapist and murderer known as "Mr Cruel".

Arrest and trial
On April 24, 2018, Sacramento County Sheriff's deputies arrested DeAngelo. He was charged with eight counts of first-degree murder with special circumstances. On May 10, the Santa Barbara County District Attorney's office charged DeAngelo with four additional counts of first-degree murder.

DeAngelo made a confession of sorts after his arrest that cryptically referred to an inner personality named "Jerry", who had forced him to commit the wave of crimes that ended abruptly in 1986. According to Sacramento County prosecutor Thien Ho, DeAngelo said the following to himself while alone in a police interrogation room after his arrest in April 2018: "I didn't have the strength to push him out. He made me. He went with me. It was like in my head, I mean, he's a part of me. I didn't want to do those things. I pushed Jerry out and had a happy life. I did all those things. I destroyed all their lives. So now I've got to pay the price."

DeAngelo could not be charged with rapes or burglaries, as the statute of limitations had expired for those offenses, but he was charged with 13 counts of murder and 13 counts of kidnapping. DeAngelo was arraigned in Sacramento on August 23, 2018. In November 2018, prosecutors from six involved counties collectively estimated that the case could cost taxpayers $20 million and last ten years. At an April 10, 2019 court proceeding, prosecutors announced that they would seek the death penalty, and the judge ruled that cameras could be allowed inside the courtroom during the trial. On March 4, 2020, DeAngelo offered to plead guilty if the death penalty were taken off the table, which was not accepted at the time. On June 29, as part of a plea bargain to avoid the death penalty, DeAngelo pleaded guilty to thirteen counts of first-degree murder and special circumstances (including murder committed during burglaries and rapes), as well as thirteen counts of kidnapping. On August 21, 2020, DeAngelo received multiple consecutive life sentences without the possibility of parole. DeAngelo offered a brief apology after listening to days of pre-sentencing victim impact statements: "I've listened to all your statements, each one of them, and I'm truly sorry to everyone I've hurt."

Family reaction
DeAngelo committed most of the offenses while he was married and raising a family. Neither his wife nor his children ever suspected he was committing serious crimes. His eldest daughter thought he was the perfect father, while his wife believed his reasons for being away from home.

Incarceration
In November 2020, DeAngelo was transferred to the North Kern State Prison.

As of February 2021, DeAngelo is incarcerated in protective custody at California State Prison, Corcoran.

See also 
 List of serial killers in the United States
 List of serial rapists by number of victims

References

Further reading

Literature

Periodicals 
  (includes numerous photos and maps)
  A seven-part series that profiles California's most prolific uncaught serial killer.

Podcasts

Television

Academic articles

External links 

 
 Cold Case – EARONS at coldcase-earons.com
 EAR/ONS magazine – 188-page magazine of related photos and news articles (from Casefile)
  Map of the EAR/ONS crimes
 
 Map of the East Area Rapist / Original Night Stalker / Golden State Killer Crimes
 True Crime Diary at truecrimediary.com
 Collection of newspaper clippings about the Golden State Killer at Newspapers.com

 
1945 births
1970s murders in the United States
1973 crimes in the United States
1975 murders in the United States
1976 crimes in the United States
1977 crimes in the United States
1978 murders in the United States
1979 murders in the United States
1980 murders in the United States
1980s murders in the United States
1981 murders in the United States
1986 murders in the United States
20th-century American criminals
American burglars
American kidnappers
American male criminals
American people convicted of kidnapping
American people convicted of murder
American people of Italian descent
American police officers convicted of murder
American prisoners sentenced to life imprisonment
American rapists
American serial killers
Animal cruelty incidents
Child sexual abuse in the United States
Crime in California
Crime in Los Angeles
Crime in the San Francisco Bay Area
Criminals from California
Criminals from Los Angeles
Criminals from New York (state)
Criminals of the San Francisco Bay Area
History of Contra Costa County, California
History of Irvine, California
History of Los Angeles
History of Orange County, California
History of Sacramento County, California
History of Santa Barbara County, California
History of Tulare County, California
History of Ventura County, California
Living people
Male serial killers
Military personnel from New York (state)
Murder in California
People convicted of murder by California
People from Bath, New York
Prisoners sentenced to life imprisonment by California
Rapes in the United States
Serial killers who worked in law enforcement
Stalking
United States Navy personnel of the Vietnam War
United States Navy sailors
Ventura, California
Violence against women in the United States